Vice president of Algeria was a political position in Algeria. Vice presidency was left vacant during the term of Houari Boumédiène. Vice Presidents were appointed by the president.

Vice presidents

References

Politics of Algeria
Government of Algeria
Vice presidents of Algeria
Algeria